Marco Rapp (born 5 June 1991) is a German retired footballer.

References

External links
 
 

1991 births
Living people
German footballers
SpVgg Greuther Fürth players
VfB Stuttgart II players
Chemnitzer FC players
Kickers Offenbach players
3. Liga players
Regionalliga players
Association football midfielders
Footballers from Nuremberg